Oliver Sunday Akanite (14 April 1947 – 20 June 2008), better known by the stage name Oliver De Coque, was a Nigerian guitarist and one of Africa's most prolific recording artists.

Early life and career 
De Coque was born in Ezinifite, Anambra State, Nigeria, in 1947, to an Igbo family. He started playing music at the age of 11 and was taught to play the guitar by a Congolese guitarist living in Nigeria. De Coque was an apprentice of juju musicians Sunny Agaga and Jacob Oluwale and became locally well known by the time he was a teenager.

De Coque received international attention after performing in London in 1973, and his guitar work was featured in Prince Nico Mbarga's 1977 album Sweet Mother.

His debut album, Messiah Messiah, was released in 1977. In total, De Coque recorded 93 albums. Many of his songs were noted to be in the ogene genre, blending modern music with traditional Igbo harmonies. Singles included "People's Club of Nigeria", "Nempi Social Club", "Biri Ka Mbiri", "Ana Enwe Obodo enwe", "Nnukwu Mmanwu" and "Identity", the latter of which spent several weeks on Radio Nigeria 2's Top Ten in 1981.

In addition to his solo work, De Coque frequently played with the Igede International Band, led by his brother Eugene.

Personal life and death 
De Coque had at least four sons, including Solar De Coque, Safin De Coque (Darlington Akanite), Edu De Coque (Chinedu Akanite), and Ikenna Akanite.

De Coque was awarded an honorary degree in music from the University of New Orleans.

De Coque died on 20 June 2008 following a sudden cardiac arrest. His son subsequently noted that De Coque had prioritised performing 2008 but had planned to seek medical advice the month after his death.

Legacy 
On 14 April 2021, a Google Doodle showcased De Coque to mark what would have been his 74th birthday.

Partial discography
Messiah Messiah (1977)

References

Musicians from Nnewi
Igbo singers
Igbo-language singers
1947 births
2008 deaths
Nigerian male singer-songwriters
Nigerian guitarists
Nigerian record producers
Igbo highlife musicians
20th-century Nigerian male singers
20th-century guitarists